Grey (stylized as GREY) is a Japanese science fiction manga created by Yoshihisa Tagami that was published in the 1980s. It has also been adapted into an animated feature film under the title Grey: Digital Target.

Premise

The world is covered in wastelands that are dotted with numbered "Towns". All Towns are supervised by computers called "Little Mamas" (nodes connected to the world governing super-computer called "Big Mama"); the underprivileged live in the slums and are referred to as "People". One can only become one of the privileged "Citizens" by joining the army and fighting the other Towns' forces, as the Towns are continually at war with one another. Soldier Grey, on track to become a Citizen, earns the nickname "Grey Death" for his tenacity on the battlefield and ability to survive when the rest of his comrades are killed. Grey's field commander, a man that saved his life many times, is lost in the African sector. He goes looking for him, discovering who and what the resistance fighters are, why the Towns are all different in both military might and how they are run, and what the true secret of "Big Mama" is.

Reception 
In the introduction to the Viz Media English adaptation, Harlan Ellison compared Grey to his own type of hard-edged speculative fiction.

Films
Where the manga stays on a downward spiral of tragedy, a few choices in the anime adaptation provide some hope to Grey and his companions.

Helen McCarthy praised the film in her book 500 Essential Anime Movies as being "intelligently written". She stated that "although the animation is dated, this is one of the most poignant and compelling anime ever made", calling it a "bleak yet uncompromisingly courageous view of the individual choices and chances against the system".

Justin Sevakis from Anime News Network commented about the film as one of the "few anime that genuinely says something original about the world and societies in which we live, and perhaps one of the better ones is Grey: Digital Target." He felt it was "incredibly rushed, relying on a combination of quick flashbacks and bland dialogue to do the sort of narrative and dramatic heavy lifting that a better show would have conveyed visually." This detriment causes the character development to be "are more or less wasted" and didn't produce "any sort of real attachment". He praised the film with its "thought provoking ideas—ideas with roots in the revolutionary ideas of a teenager, but with the understanding of the world that only an adult can bring" but admittedly, it "has too many flaws to be recommended wholeheartedly."

Influence
In 2022 Lawrence English used Grey as the basis for his album Approach.

References

External links
 "Translated Manga Pick of the Month"—J-pop.com
 Entry in The Encyclopedia of Science Fiction

1986 anime films
Action anime and manga
Android (robot) comics
Ashi Productions
Cyborg comics
Mecha anime and manga
Post-apocalyptic anime and manga
Shōnen manga
Tokuma Shoten manga
Viz Media manga